Sriwijaya Football Club, commonly known as Sriwijaya [sriwiˈdʒaja] or SFC, is an Indonesian professional football club based in Palembang, South Sumatra, that competes in the Liga 2, the second tier of Indonesian football. The club was founded on 23 October 2004 after the South Sumatra government bought Persijatim Solo FC, which was based in Surakarta. Their current home stadium is Gelora Sriwijaya Stadium in Jakabaring, southern section of Palembang. The club is widely known by their nickname, Laskar Wong Kito (Our Warriors). Sriwijaya is the first club in Indonesia which achieves double titles achievement in the same season.

History 
The club was founded in 1976 as Persijatim Jakarta Timur with home base in East Jakarta. Due to a financial crisis, the club was sold and moved to Solo, Central Java in 2002, changed their club name to Persijatim Solo FC. In 2004, South Sumatra Government bought the debt-ridden Persijatim as they wanted to manage a Palembang-based football team to compete in the top tier of Indonesian football system since the province did not have any football clubs competing in the top tier of Indonesian football league, after the dissolution of Krama Yudha Tiga Berlian in 1992. The government also did not want the Gelora Sriwijaya Stadium to go wasted after the 2004 National Games. The club then changed its name to Sriwijaya FC and moved its home base to Palembang, South Sumatra. The name Sriwijaya is thought to come from the ancient Srivijaya Empire, an empire that used to rule the land in the old days. The club is owned by PT Sriwijaya Optimis Mandiri.

It is the first team to have done a double in Indonesia by winning both 2007–08 Liga Indonesia Premier Division and 2008 Piala Indonesia in the same season. This double winner achievement was also its first titles since the foundation of the club. The following years saw Sriwijaya again winning the Piala Indonesia in 2009 and 2010, setting up a record as the first team to have won the Piala Indonesia three years in a row. Sriwijaya also managed to win the 2011–12 Indonesia Super League, as well as the 2010 and 2012 Indonesian Inter Island Cup.

Relegation to Indonesian Liga 2 in 2018
The team failed to build on their success after winning the 2011–12 Indonesia Super League and the club was relegated (six years later after the triumph) to the Indonesian second division, Liga 2 in 2018. This happened after they finished second from bottom in the 2018 season Liga 1.

Key 

Key to league record:
 Pos = Final position
 P = Played
 W = Games won
 D = Games drawn
 L = Games lost
 GF = Goals for
 GA = Goals against
 GD = Goal difference
 Pts = Points

Key to rounds:
 W = Winner
 F = Final
 SF = Semi-finals
 QF = Quarter-finals
 R16 = Round of 16
 R32 = Round of 32
 R64 = Round of 64
 R5 = Fifth round
 R4 = Fourth round
 R3 = Third round
 R2 = Second round
 R1 = First round
 GS = Group stage

Key to competitions
 Cup = Piala Indonesia
 CL = AFC Champions League
 AC = AFC Cup

Seasons

 = ISL wasn't recognized by PSSI at that year

Continental history

Stadium 

Sriwijaya's home fields are Gelora Sriwijaya Stadium and Bumi Sriwijaya Stadium.

Logo 
The first circle of the team crest symbolizes the club's strength, unity and peace. The words Sumatera Selatan shows that it is owned by South Sumatra government. Bersatu Teguh is a representation of the supporters' and the club's wholeness. The Garuda image shows power and thoroughness. Behind the main logo, Mount Dempo and Ampera Bridge can be seen, both seen as South Sumatra's pride and determination.

Kit suppliers 
Specs (2005–2008)
 Reebok (2009–2010)
 Specs (2011–2012)
 Joma (2012–2016)
 Calci (2017–2020)
 Tweve (2021)

Players

Current squad

Naturalized players

All time topscorers

Coaches

Coaching Staff

Honours 

 = ISL wasn't recognized by PSSI at that year

AFC (Asian competitions)
 AFC Champions League
 2009 – Group stage
 2010 – Preliminary round
 2011 – Play-off round
 AFC Cup
 2010 –  Round of 16
 2011 – Round of 16

Friendly tournaments
 Piala Gubernur Kaltim
 Winner (1): 2018

References

External links 
  
 Sriwijaya FC Profile on Eyesoccer Football Database 

Palembang
Football clubs in Indonesia
South Sumatra
Indonesian Premier Division winners
Association football clubs established in 2004
2004 establishments in Indonesia
Sport in South Sumatra
Football clubs in South Sumatra
Sriwijaya F.C.